Aminothiophenol may refer to:

 2-Aminothiophenol
 
 4-Aminothiophenol